The Australian International School (AIS), in Singapore is a co-educational international school in Singapore. The school is owned by Cognita. AIS is made up of three sub-schools: Early Years (for children aged 2 months to 6 years); an Elementary School (for students in Prep to Year 5) and a Secondary School (Year 6 to Year 12).

AIS engages different global curricula across its sub-schools. In 2007, the school adopted the International Baccalaureate (IB) Primary Years Program (PYP) for Elementary students. In Secondary school, students take the Australian Curriculum (Years 6 to 8); the Cambridge IGCSE (Years 9 and 10) and in Years 11 and 12, can choose to take either the International Baccalaureate Diploma Program (IBDP) or the New South Wales (NSW) Higher School Certificate (HSC) examinations.

AIS implemented a pro-active response to the COVID-19 pandemic and facilitated home-based learning in April and May 2020.

History
The Australian International School opened on 3 February 1993 at its first campus on Mount Sophia, an area behind Plaza Singapura and the Cathay Building reconstruction. The School started under the leadership of Miss Coral Dickson with 32 students and 7 teachers. By the end of 1993, there were over 200 students.

The school experienced rapid growth and by the end of July 1994, with numbers just over 500, the students moved to Emerald Hill, directly behind Orchard Road. Although the School was bigger and could accommodate more students it still did not have a full–sized gym, pool, theatre and other much needed facilities.

As the School continued to expand, it was clear that space was running out in Emerald Hill and by the end of 1997, AIS had moved to Ulu Pandan, near Clementi, the site of the old Singapore American School, which had recently moved to a new site at Woodlands.

The School enjoyed just over 5 years at Ulu Pandan during which time it finally secured land to construct a purpose-built school at Lorong Chuan, with first-class facilities. In February 2002, Mr Peter Bond began as Principal of AIS.  The School moved from Ulu Pandan to its final "home" at Lorong Chuan over the holidays in July 2003, with 1100 students enrolled.   The school was officially opened by then Deputy Prime Minister of Australia, John Anderson and Singapore's then Acting Minister for Education, Tharman Shanmugaratnam.

In October 2007, the School was purchased by the Cognita Group of Schools and in July 2008, a Junior School and Preschool wing were built to house children from Preschool to Year 2 at a purpose-built facility. The campus is a bright, airy and semi-modern building with large pod spaces for group work.  In 2011, a new Senior building was opened to accommodate Year 10, 11 and 12 students. This wing incorporates private study spaces, nearly 40 classrooms and a new Science, Art, Music and Technology area.

In January 2012, Dr Nick Miller, a former principal of YMCA of Hong Kong Christian College, took over as Principal of AIS, and the School moved to a new school structure with two sub-schools: Elementary School (Preschool, Junior School and Primary School) and Secondary School.

In March 2014, Dr Nick Miller announced his resignation as the Principal of AIS. At the end of 2014, Andre Casson took over as Principal of AIS.

Currently there are roughly 2800 students enrolled and the School employs over 220 members of teaching staff.

Leadership Team

The school's executive team comprises:
 Dr Edward Groughan (Head of School)
 Adam Patterson (Principal)
 PJ Roberts (Managing Director - Operations)
 Eromie Dassanayake (Head of Early Years)
 Emma McAulay (Head of Elementary)
 Brad Bird (Head of Secondary)
 Matt Hall (Director of Admissions & Marketing)
 Anita Mahesan (Director of Finance)

Ownership
AIS has been privately owned by Cognita since 2007. Cognita is an international independent schools group.  Founded in 2004, the Cognita family of schools now incorporates over 69 schools world-wide, with schools in the UK, Spain, South America, Thailand, Singapore and Vietnam, covering the age range of 3 – 18 years.

Curriculum 
AIS's Early Years is inspired by the principles of the Reggio Emilia teaching philosophy, which places the child at the centre of the learning journey and values he environment as the 'third teacher'. Children are given the opportunity to explore the environment around them, where new discoveries can be made. Instead of restricting students to a rigid learning format, the curriculum allows them to acquire knowledge based on their innate learning abilities.

The Australian Curriculum begins at Nursery and extends through to Year 8. Alongside this, the globally renowned International Baccalaureate Primary Years Program (IB PYP) is introduced from Early Years to Year 5 in the Elementary School, supported by selected complementary teaching methodologies and a curriculum framework specific to the needs of students.

In Years 9 and 10, all AIS students take the Cambridge IGCSE, the world's most popular international qualification for this age group. The Cambridge IGCSE is highly regarded for its academic rigour and for preparing students for their senior secondary years.

In Years 11 and 12, AIS offers the choice between two highly challenging graduation programs: the New South Wales Higher School Certificate (NSW) or the International Baccalaureate Diploma Program (IBDP).

References

External links

 Official website
 Cognita's web site showing details on AIS

Australian international schools in Singapore
Cognita
Educational institutions established in 1993
1993 establishments in Singapore